Amita Pathak is an actress, model, and producer. She studied acting at the Kishore Namit Kapoor Acting Academy and the Shiamak Davar Institute of Performing Arts.

Personal life

Her father is producer Kumar Mangat. Pathak married singer Raghav Sachar on 21 January 2014.

Filmography

Music videos

References

External links
 
 

Indian film actresses
Female models from Delhi
Living people
1989 births
Indian women film producers
Film producers from Delhi
Hindi film producers
Actresses in Hindi cinema
21st-century Indian actresses
Actresses from Delhi
Businesswomen from Delhi